The Australian Antarctic Medal (stylised  as post-nominal), originally designated the Antarctic Medal until 18 December 1997, is a meritorious service award of the Australian honours and awards system, instituted by Letters Patent on 2 June 1987 (amended 18 December 1997 and 13 December 2011).

Unique among the Australian meritorious service awards, the Australian Antarctic Medal may be awarded to the same person more than once. The medal may be awarded to anyone who has given outstanding service in connection with an Antarctic expedition, in scientific research, exploration, or in support of such work. Except in exceptional circumstances however, the medal will only be awarded if the nominee has also worked at least 12 months (cumulative) in Antarctic climates south of latitude 60° South, or in similar climate and terrain conditions elsewhere in the Antarctic region.

The Australian Antarctic Medal is also unique in that (other than the first time when it was awarded, which occurred on 22 June 1987) awardees are announced in their own Midwinter's Day (21 June) awards list.

The Australian Antarctic Medal has only in one instance been awarded to the same person twice - to Graham Robertson - and only four times posthumously (to Howard Burton, Neil Adams, John Oakes, and  Patrick Quilty ).

Design

The Australian Antarctic Medal is a nickel-silver octagonal medal, 32 mm in diameter, ensigned with a hexagonal ice-crystal device, surmounted by a plain suspender bar. The obverse (front of the medal) bears a depiction of the Southern Hemisphere showing Australia and the Antarctic enclosed by the inscription "FOR OUTSTANDING SERVICE IN THE ANTARCTIC".

The reverse (back) of the Australian Antarctic Medal has an Antarctic expeditioner outside Mawson's hut, leaning into a blizzard as they use an ice-axe.

The Australian Antarctic Medal is suspended on a 32 mm snow-white moire ribbon, with 3 mm edging of three shades of blue that merge into the white of the ribbon (representing the transition of water to ice as one approaches Antarctica). A date bar, being a nickel-silver clasp of 30 mm wide and 6 mm high, inscribed with the year the eligible service was rendered, is attached to the ribbon of the medal.

Second and subsequent awards of the Australian Antarctic Medal are recognised by the awarding of another nickel-silver date bar clasp, worn on the ribbon above the medal (and positioned above any earlier date bar clasps), and by the use of 9 mm replicas of the ice-crystal device for each subsequent award on the ribbon bar (worn on uniforms when not wearing the medal).

The miniature of the Australian Antarctic Medal is a half-sized replica of the medal, suspended from a miniature of the ribbon that is 16 mm wide. Half-sized replicas of date bar clasps are worn on the ribbon of the miniature medal.

A lapel badge, being a 10 mm wide replica of the hexagonal ice-crystal device used on the medal, is also provided to awardees.

History

Prior to 2 June 1987, eligible service on Australian Antarctic expeditions (known as Australian National Antarctic Research Expeditions at that time) was recognised by the Polar Medal under the Imperial honours system.

Origins

When Australian Prime Minister Bob Hawke came to power in 1983, he declared his government would no longer be making any recommendations for Imperial honours and awards. The Australian Antarctic Names and Medals Committee, which had been set up by Ministerial appointment, declared at its meeting of 3 December 1984 that an Australian award should be created to honour outstanding achievement in the Australian Antarctic Territory, including for scientific achievement and exploration, and outlined some design specifications for the proposed medal. On 26 January 1986, Hawke announced the intention to seek Letters Patent for a new meritorious service award to recognise extraordinary service in the Antarctic region by Australian polar expeditioners, to be called the Australian Antarctic Medal.

Initial designs of the medal were drafted by Michael Tracey, but the Australian Antarctic Names and Medals Committee expressed some dissatisfaction with some of his design elements, and Stuart Devlin  replaced him as designer (although Tracey's map on the obverse of the medal was retained). Stuart Devlin's final design was approved by the government on 21 January 1987.

On 2 June 1987, the Queen of Australia, Elizabeth II, issued Letters Patent instituting the Antarctic Medal.

Production delays

Although 16 inaugural awardees of the Antarctic Medal were announced on 22 June 1987, covering meritorious service as far back as 1981, extended production delays with the Antarctic Medal and its ribbon resulted in it taking two years before these medals were presented to them.

Re-naming and post-nominals

In 1993, the then Keating federal government established a Review of Australian Honours and Awards Committee, to make recommendations about the Australian honours and awards system. The committee delivered its report in 1995, and one of its recommendations was that the Antarctic Medal be re-named the Australian Antarctic Medal, and be granted the post-nominal AAM (the preceding Imperial Polar Medal and the Antarctic Medal had no entitlement to use of a post-nominal).

On 18 December 1997, the Queen of Australia, Elizabeth II, issued Letters Patent authorising the amendment of the original Letters Patent to change the designation of the Antarctic Medal to the Australian Antarctic Medal and authorised the use of the AAM post-nominal to those who had been awarded this medal.

Expansion of eligibility

Prior to 13 December 2011, the conditions for the award of the Australian Antarctic Medal were that, except in exceptional circumstances, only those who had accumulated 12 months or more in Antarctic climate and terrain conditions, and who had given outstanding service in (either directly, or in support of) scientific research or exploration, in the course of, or in connection with, an Australian Antarctic expedition were eligible to be considered for this meritorious award.

On 13 December 2011, the Queen of Australia, Elizabeth II, issued Letters Patent authorising the amendment of the original Letters Patent (and its regulations) to allow eligibility for the Australian Antarctic Medal to be expanded so that persons representing an Australian agency or institution on foreign Antarctic expeditions could also be considered for this medal.

List of recipients

As at Midwinter's Day (21 June) 2020, the Australian Antarctic Medal (also known as the Antarctic Medal prior to 1998) has been awarded 104 times to 103 individuals (one person has received the medal twice). In four cases the medal was awarded posthumously. Apart from its inaugural award, which occurred on 22 June 1987, it has always been awarded on Midwinter's Day, although in some years no awards have been made (2003, 2010, 2014, 2015, 2017 and 2019).

From 1987 to 1991, no short citation was given when the medal was awarded. From 1992 to 1997, the short citation For outstanding service in connection with Australian Antarctic expeditions was used. In 1998, the short citation For outstanding service in support of Australia's Antarctic Program was used. From 1999 to 2011 the short citation For outstanding service in support of Australian Antarctic expeditions was used. Generic short citations were replaced with individual short citations from 2012 until 2016, when short citations were no longer given.

The only awardee to have received the Australian Antarctic Medal twice (where an additional clasp is given to the recipient, to place on the ribbon of the medal, and the ice crystal device is worn on the ribbon bar, when the medal is not worn) is Graham Robertson (who received his medal in 1989, and his additional clasp in 2012).

The four posthumous awards made to date are to Howard Burton (d. 5 November 1993) in 1994, Neil Adams (d. 23 March 2012) in 2012, John Oakes (d. 23 July 2016) in 2018, and Patrick Quilty (d. 26 August 2018) in 2020.

See also
 Australian honours and awards system
 Australian Honours Order of Wearing
 Australian Antarctic Division
 Australian National Antarctic Research Expeditions
 Casey Station
 Davis Station
 Mawson Station
 Macquarie Island Station

Notes

References

Civil awards and decorations of Australia
Awards established in 1987
Awards for polar exploration
Long and Meritorious Service Medals of Britain and the Commonwealth